Alfred Diratsagae "Papi" Kganare (died 3 July 2021) was a South African politician from Free State. A member of South Africa's Congress of the People, he served as a Member of the National Assembly of South Africa from 2009 until 2014.

Kganare died from COVID-19.

References

20th-century births
2021 deaths
African National Congress politicians
Members of the National Assembly of South Africa
Deaths from the COVID-19 pandemic in South Africa